Henry John Corra (born November 11, 1955) is an American documentary filmmaker best known for pioneering what he calls "living cinema".

Background
Henry Corra is an American documentary filmmaker best known for pioneering what he calls "living cinema". Corra’s films have been exhibited worldwide in theatrical venues and broadcast and streaming outlets such as HBO, Showtime, LOGO, CBS, PBS, Arte, Channel 4, Netflix, iTunes, Amazon Hulu, Sundance and Fandor. His work has also been exhibited in museum and cultural venues internationally including MoMA, the Louvre, the National Gallery of Art, the Pacific Film Archive and the Smithsonian Institution, and is on permanent collection at the Academy of Motion Picture Arts and Sciences. A Sundance and Tribeca Institute Fellow, he has also done episodic TV projects for broadcasters including MTV, VH1, Bravo, and the Sundance Channel. In addition to his film work, Corra has been singled out as one of the foremost directors of non-fiction commercials and advocacy advertising in America with groundbreaking campaigns for clients including the American Cancer Society, NYC Health, Mercedes Benz USA, Jet Blue, Starbucks and Google.

Filmography
Farewell to Hollywood (2014, 102 minutes, co-directed with Regina Nicholson) In a recurring poetic image, 17-year-old Regina Diane Nicholson swings between heaven and earth on a breathtakingly high cliff by the sea. Reggie is a tomboy struggling with cancer, her parents and her dream of making a film. She impresses us with her loving, strong personality and wisdom beyond her years, as well as her morbid sense of humor. Together with director Henry Corra, she is working on a portrait of herself and her struggle with her illness. The film’s initial focus is on Reggie, but it quickly makes way for an escalating conflict between her and her parents as Reggie develops a closer relationship with Henry, who takes her seriously. When Reggie turns 18 and can make decisions on her own, things become even more intense. This film is a poetic fairytale about love and death, holding on and letting go, one that invites us to discuss the relationship between the maker, subject and family. An eclectic mix of images with the intimacy of a video diary or home movie, it is filmed both by Henry and by Reggie and supplemented by their text message exchanges, images from her favorite movies, and fairytale-like scenes with songs that together form a heartwarming, but also heartbreaking and controversial ode to Reggie. Winner of the Audience Award at EDOX 2013. Winner of the CANON CINEMATOGRAPHY AWARD and Honorable Mention for Grand Prix competition at the 11. PLANETE + DOC.

The Disappearance of McKinley Nolan (2010, 77 minutes) Private McKinley Nolan vanished forty years ago in Vietnam on the Cambodian frontier. Some say he was captured, some say he was a traitor, some even say he was an American operative. The US Army officially claims he was radicalized and "went native", joining the Viet Cong and later encountering the Khmer Rouge. In 2006, retired US Army Lt. Dan Smith, revisiting the battlefields of his youth, may have encountered the elusive McKinley, alive. So began a journey into the heart of darkness. Marlon Brando was not found at the end of this. The film will have a world premiere in June 2010.

Jack (2009, 87 minutes, co-directed with Eben Bull) Here is Jack, the most lovable train wreck you've ever met. This highly original documentary is an authentic portrait of an advanced alcoholic on what could be his final run. Never judging or proclaiming, the film is a wild ride that you can't get off. Eventually, even Jack runs out of road.

NY77: The Coolest Year in Hell (2007, 83 minutes) A VH1 Rock Doc that documents one of the most tumultuous years in New York City’s history. The Emmy nominated documentary examines everything from the birth of hip-hop, the burgeoning disco movement, the famed New York blackout, the Son of Sam murders, the sexual revolution and the city’s ongoing financial and political problems. The list of people interviewed by Corra includes Mayor Ed Koch, Screw magazine publisher Al Goldstein, porn actress Annie Sprinkle, hip-hop pioneers KRS One, Afrika Bambaataa and D.J. Kool Herc, punk’s Richard Hell, Blondie’s Christ Stein, Studio 54 co-owner Ian Schrager and disco diva Gloria Gaynor.

Same Sex America (2005, 90 minutes, co-directed with Charlene Rule) History was made when Massachusetts became the first state in the nation to sanction gay marriage. Filmmaker Henry Corra weaves the stories of seven gay and lesbian couples on their emotional journey to the altar with the dramatic showdown at Massachusetts' constitutional convention, a vivid demonstration of democracy in action that may change the course of history. The film captures all the nuance of what may be the defining chapter in the history of the gay and lesbian struggle for equal rights.

Frames (2004, 53 minutes, co-directed with Charlene Rule) In this film about legendary media artist Grahame Weinbren, Corra effectively captures the complexity, mystery and excitement of the creative process. The film takes its lead from Weinbren’s work where spectators become characters and subjects, living participants as they interact with sound and story, image and screen. Frames had its world premiere at the 2004 Tribeca Film Festival in New York City.

George (2000, 88 minutes, co-directed with Grahame Weinbren) Described by Amy Taubin in The Village Voice, as "an exceptionally intelligent and moving documentary that explores Corra’s twelve-year-old autistic son George, who uses his own video camera to make a movie within the movie. In fact, the film is about how we define normalcy." George had its American theatrical premiere at The Screening Room, New York and was shown at the Museum of Modern Art, New York, The National Gallery of Art, Washington, D.C., The Gaga Film Festival, Berlin Germany. It aired on HBO in July 2000. "The more you know, the more you care. The more you care, the more your heart will break," said Ron Wertheimer in the New York Times.

Umbrellas (1994, 93 minutes, co-directed with Grahame Weinbren) The controversial story of the artist Christo’s grand-scale environmental art project in Japan and California that ended in the tragic death of two of its spectators. At its world premiere in 1994 at the Berlin International Film Festival, Howard Feinstein of Variety praised the film as, "highly original and structurally flawless . . . an ambitious documentary about an ambitious project." Umbrellas won The Grand Prize at the Montreal International Film Festival. It was shown at the Museum of Modern Art, New York, the National Gallery of Art, Washington, D.C. and The Louvre Museum, Paris and on the European network ARTE.

Change of Heart (1992, 57 minutes, co-directed withbefore  Kate Hirson) This documentary explores the reversal of heart disease through changes in lifestyle. It is an intimate portrait of four patients, four wives and one doctor. Change of Heart premiered nationally on PBS/NOVA in 1992 and was shown at: NY Film and TV Festival (1992), National Film and Video Festival (1992), Blakeslee Award for Medical Journalism (1992), Academy of Medical Films (1992).

Television and Commercials
MTV True Life: I'm Ex-Amish (2010), Directed by Henry Corra) Growing up Amish can be tough: no phones, electricity, or cars, and your parents teach you to fear the "devil’s playground" outside your door. So what happens when you want to move on, break free, and join the outside world? Corra Films followed three young adults who have left the flock on their journey to find independence, a new life, and a new kind of family. Currently airing on MTV.

See also
 The Disappearance of McKinley Nolan

References

External links
 
 Corra Films, Inc.
 Interview with Corra and editor Charlene Rule on Same Sex America
 
 Corra Films on Facebook
 www.farewelltohollywood.com

1955 births
American film directors
Place of birth missing (living people)
Living people